The 2005 Copa Sudamericana, also known as the 2005 Copa Nissan Sudamericana de Clubes for sponsorship reasons, was the 4th edition of the international football cup competition played annually by clubs of CONMEBOL, and starting with this edition invited teams from CONCACAF. Boca Juniors successfully defended the Sudamericana trophy, winning the tournament for the second time.

First stage

|-
!colspan="5"|Chile/Peru Preliminary

|-
!colspan="5"|Bolivia/Ecuador Preliminary

|-
!colspan="5"|Paraguay/Uruguay Preliminary

|-
!colspan="5"|Colombia/Venezuela Preliminary

|}

Second stage

|-

|-

|-

|-

|-

|-

|-

|-

|-

|-

|}

Knockout rounds

Finals

External links
Official site
Official rules 

2
Copa Sudamericana seasons